Donald-Aik Sild (born 3 October 1968) is a retired male javelin thrower from Estonia.

Sild was born in Tallinn, and represented his native country at the 1996 Summer Olympics in Atlanta, United States. He set his personal best (85.28 metres) on 11 June 1994 in Saint-Denis, France.

Achievements

References

sports-reference

1968 births
Living people
Estonian male javelin throwers
Athletes (track and field) at the 1996 Summer Olympics
Olympic athletes of Estonia
Athletes from Tallinn
World Athletics Championships athletes for Estonia